Shmuel Shapiro (a French Jewish rabbi, hazzan, singer, composer, lecturer, and former Chief Rabbi of Meurthe-et-Moselle and Nancy, France, was born in Aix-les-Bains, France, on January 26, 1974.

Biography
His mother, Elisheva, is a musician and a lecturer in Judaism, and his father, David-Nathan, served as the rabbi of Clermont-Ferrand and Vichy. The family immigrated to Israel when he was nine years old.

He studied at the Ohel Shimon Erloy yeshivot in Jerusalem where he placed second in a Talmudic competition at the age of twelve.

He began composing music at the age of eleven, and by the time he was seventeen he was the principal cantorial singer in the Erlau Hasidic community.

After completing his studies in psychology and Jewish philosophy, he taught Judaism at the French-speaking Or Gabriel yeshiva in Jerusalem.

In 1994, he studied in a Kollel institute and taught in remedial education at the Tsafnat Panea'h school in Jerusalem.

He studied hazanuth at Hechal Shlomo school in Jerusalem under the direction of his teachers Eli Jaffe and Benjamin Munk.

He also developed his voice with the opera singer Gee Flashter, the cantor Avraham Pressman, and the maestro Daniel Gildar in Jerusalem, New York, and Paris.

In 1998, he was sent to France by Chief Rabbi Yitzchak Dovid Grossman for an educational mission at the Ozar HaTorah school in Sarcelles and with the local Jewish community

In 2001, Shmuel Shapiro gave lectures on Judaism, music, and voice for the radio station Kol Haneshama, broadcast in Israel and the United States. He served as cantor of Rabbi Grossman's Migdal HaEmek synagogue in Israel.

In 2005, he was an educational advisor for the Chneor institutions in Aubervilliers 

From 2006 to 2020, he lectured and served as the hazzan at the synagogue of the rue de Montevideo in the 16th arrondissement of Paris.

Shmuel Shapiro is a highly educated individual who gives courses, lectures and advice on a variety of subjects to the community.

He was the rabbi of Nancy and its region until November 2020.

His debut album, Seu Marom, was recorded in 2013 in France and Israel with arrangements by Didier Atlan. He composed the majority of the songs.

In 2022, he moved to Monaco and presently serves as rabbi and cantor at the Edmond Safra synagogue. 

He is married and has five children and three grandchildren.

Discography

Albums

Studio albums
 2013: Seu Marom (Of languages: Hebrew, French, English, Yiddish and Holy Tongue)

Singles
 2000: Ko Amar
 2004: Ahavat Israel
 2011: The Key
 2012: Se'u Marom
 2015: Ahavat Israel II
 2016: Dos Yiddishe Lied

Collaborations
 2002: Kel Mistater (Otzrot Shabat 2'', David Honig)

Music Videos
 2011: The Key (for Gilad Shalit)
 2012: Se'u Marom
 2015: Ahavat Israel II

References

External links
 Shmuel Shapiro Official Site
 Shmuel Shapiro in YouTube
 Shmuel Shapiro in Facebook
 Shmuel Shapiro in Fnac

1974 births
Living people
French Orthodox Jews
20th-century French male singers
Jewish singers
Chabad-Lubavitch Hasidim
Jewish songwriters
Hasidic entertainers
Yiddish-language singers
Hasidic singers
French child singers
21st-century French male singers
Orthodox pop musicians